58th Brigade or 58th Infantry Brigade may refer to:

 58th Brigade (People's Republic of China)
 58th Independent Motorized Infantry Brigade (Ukraine) of the Ukrainian Ground Forces
 58th Indian Brigade of the British Indian Army in the First World War
 58th Divisional Trench Mortar Brigade of the British Army in the First World War
 58th Brigade (United Kingdom)
 58th Battlefield Surveillance Brigade (United States)

See also

 58th Division (disambiguation)